Ardchoille Lodge is an historic building in Bridgend, Perth and Kinross, Scotland. Located on Strathmore Street, it is a Category C listed building, built in 1851. It was the gatehouse to the 1851-built Ardchoille House.

References

1851 establishments in Scotland
Listed buildings in Bridgend, Perth and Kinross
Category C listed buildings in Perth and Kinross
Gatehouses (architecture)